The following are two lists of animals ordered by the size of their nervous system.  The first list shows number of neurons in their entire nervous system, indicating their overall neural complexity.  The second list shows the number of neurons in the structure that has been found to be representative of animal intelligence. The human brain contains 86 billion neurons, with 16 billion neurons in the cerebral cortex.

Scientists are engaged in counting, quantification, in order to find answers to the question in the strategy of neuroscience and intelligence of "self-knowledge": how the evolution of a set of components and parameters (~1011 neurons, ~1014  synapses) of a complex system could lead to the phenomenon of the appearance of intelligence in the biological species "sapiens".

Overview
Neurons are the cells that transmit information in an animal's nervous system so that it can sense stimuli from its environment and behave accordingly. Not all animals have neurons; Trichoplax and sponges lack nerve cells altogether.

Neurons may be packed to form structures such as the brain of vertebrates or the neural ganglions of insects.

The number of neurons and their relative abundance in different parts of the brain is a determinant of neural function and, consequently, of behavior.

Whole nervous system

All numbers for neurons (except Caenorhabditis and Ciona), and all numbers for synapses (except Ciona) are estimations.

List of animal species by forebrain (cerebrum or pallium) neuron number
The question of what physical characteristic of an animal makes an animal intelligent has varied over the centuries.  One early speculation was brain size (or weight, which provides the same ordering.)  A second proposal was brain-to-body-mass ratio, and a third was encephalization quotient, sometimes referred to as EQ.  The current best predictor is number of neurons in the forebrain, based on Herculano-Houzel's improved neuron counts.  It accounts most accurately for variations in dependence on the cerebellum.  The elephant depends on its exceptionally large cerebellum, while birds make do with a much smaller one.

Differing methods have been used to count neurons and these may differ in degree of reliability. These are the optical fractionator, an application of stereology and the isotropic fractionator, a recent methodological innovation.  Most numbers in the list are the result of studies using the newer isotropic fractionator.  A variation of the optical fractionator was responsible for the previous total human brain neuron count of 100,000,000,000 neurons, which has been revised down to 86,000,000,000 by the use of the isotropic fractionator. This is in part why it may be considered to be less reliable. Finally, some numbers are the result of estimations based on correlations observed between number of cortical neurons and brain mass within closely related taxa.

The following table gives information on the number of neurons estimated to be in the sensory-associative structure: the cerebral cortex (aka pallium) for mammals, the dorsal ventricular ridge ("DVR" or "hypopallium") of the pallium for birds, and the corpora pedunculata ("mushroom bodies") for insects.

See also 

 Lists of animals
 Theory of mind in animals
 Brain size
 Brain-to-body mass ratio
 Encephalization quotient
 Connectome
 Connectomics
 Cranial capacity
 :fr:Noogenèse
 Neuroscience and intelligence

Notes

References 

Neurons
Animal nervous system
Animals by number of neurons
Number of neurons